Christos Wheeler (born 29 June 1997) is a Cypriot professional footballer who plays as a left-back for Cypriot First Division club APOEL and the Cyprus national team.

International career
He made his debut for Cyprus national football team on 19 November 2019 in a Euro 2020 qualifier against Belgium.

References

External links 
 
 

1997 births
Living people
Apollon Limassol FC players
Karmiotissa FC players
AEL Limassol players
APOEL FC players
Cypriot footballers
Association football defenders
Cyprus youth international footballers
Cyprus under-21 international footballers
Cyprus international footballers
Cypriot First Division players
Cypriot people of American descent